The Groenfeldt Site is an archaeological site located within Sequoia National Park near Three Rivers, California. The site is located in a remote and relatively inaccessible area of the park between General Grant Grove and the Giant Forest. The site contains a rock shelter from the late prehistoric era and had a "considerable" human presence according to the National Park Service.

The Groenfeldt Site was added to the National Register of Historic Places on March 30, 1978.

References

Further reading
Mundy, W. J. The Red Fir Archaeological Investigations, Sequoia National Park, California: Test Excavations at CA-TUL-1227 (The Groenfeldt Site). 1991.

Rock shelters in the United States
Archaeological sites on the National Register of Historic Places in California
National Register of Historic Places in Tulare County, California
National Register of Historic Places in Sequoia National Park